Bilat may refer to:

 Bilat (India), a village in East Siang district, Arunachal Pradesh, India
 Bilat Paswan Vihangam (1940–2017), Indian writer and politician
 Bilat Pyan Than (1908–2007), Burmese singer and civil servant

See also
 Bilateral (disambiguation)